Maldwyn may refer to:

Maldwyn James (1913–2003), Welsh international rugby union player
Maldwyn Jones (1922–2007), historian who specialised in American history
Radio Maldwyn, local commercial radio station serving Mid Wales and the English border counties
Maldwyn Evans (1937–2009), Welsh bowls champion
Maldwyn Pope (born 1960), Welsh musician and composer
Maldwyn, the Welsh name of Montgomeryshire

See also
Cwmni Theatr Ieuenctid Maldwyn, music and theatre group based in mid Wales
Malden (disambiguation)
Maldon (disambiguation)
Maldòn